Two explosives placed at the downtown Riga shopping center Centrs detonated on 17 August 2000. The two blasts occurred in the lobby of the supermarket ten minutes apart. One person died of their injuries and 35 were wounded in the attack.

Attack
The first bomb exploded at 5:19 pm. Police arrived few minutes later and started the evacuation. The blast had shattered glass windows and filled the ground floor with smoke. Eight minutes later the second bomb exploded. Dozens were injured, three had to be rushed to hospitals whilst 33 others were treated at the scene. One woman died in hospital.

Investigation

After a year and a half police arrested Leonards Butelis who was later charged for planting the second bomb. He was acquitted by the Supreme Court one year later. Since then no one has been found guilty and charged for the explosions.

See also
List of unsolved murders

References

2000 crimes in Latvia
2000s in Riga
2000 murders in Europe
2000s murders in Latvia
20th century in Riga
Attacks in Europe in 2000
Attacks on supermarkets
August 2000 events in Europe
Building bombings in Europe
Crime in Riga
Terrorist incidents by unknown perpetrators
Terrorist incidents in Europe in 2000
Terrorist incidents in Latvia
Unsolved murders in Latvia